Mr. Coconut (Chinese: 合家歡; Pinyin: hé jiā huān) is a 1989 Hong Kong Chinese New Year film directed by Clifton Ko, it stars Michael Hui, Raymond Wong Pak-ming, Ricky Hui, Olivia Cheng and Joey Wong. The film ran in theaters from 21 January 1989 until 6 February 1989. The film depicts society's immigration problem, telling the cultural differences and contradictions between the lives of the mainlanders and Hong Kong people. The movie was a box office success.

Plot
The film centers around Ngan Kwai-Na (Michael Hui) who lives in Hainan Island, is used to the culture of villages and simple life that villagers have. One day, he gets a letter form his sister Ping (Olivia Cheng) and visits his sister in Hong Kong, as he endures the modern culture and the Hong Kong streets of the late 1980s.

Cast 
 Michael Hui as Ngan Kwai-Nam (雁歸南) - mainland villager
 Raymond Wong Pak-ming as Wong Ka-Fan (黃嘉範) - shoe store manager, Kwai-Nam's brother-in-law
 Olivia Cheng as Ping (雁燕萍) - Kwai-Nam's sister, married to Ka-Fan
 Chan Cheuk Yan as Skinny (奀珠) - Ka-Fan and Ping's daughter
 Ricky Hui as Lime (經紀拉) - manager, later insurance salesman
 Joey Wong as Ling (黃嘉玲) - flight attendant, Ka-Fan's sister
 Simon Yam as Timothy Hui (許公子) - son of a rich family, Ling's crush
 Maria Cordero as Miss Ma (老闆娘) - owner of the shoe store Ka-Fan worked at
 Tony Leung Ka-fai as Bush (高富帥) - Joey's boyfriend, short cameo and only mentioned at the end of the movie
 San Wong as Mr Hui (許先生) - Timothy's father
 Sin Huang Tam as Miss Hui (許太太) -  Timothy's mother
Lowell Lo as Fengshui expert on TV
 Pak-Kwong Ho as Taoist priest
 Ken Boyle as insurance company manager - Mandarin dubbing
 Yung-kuang Lai as Insurance company worker
 Fan Hui as Building Cleaner
 Catherine Lau as Miss Ma's maid
 Ernst Mausser as plane passenger at Bombay airport
 Simon Yip as buffet customer 
 Clifton Ko as television show host (cameo)
 Fennie Yuen as subway passenger (cameo)
 Hsiu-Ling Lu as girl at railway station (cameo)
 Loletta Lee as television shampoo commercial girl (cameo)
 Pauline Kwan as party guest girl (cameo)
 Yonfan as annoyed buffet customer (cameo)
 Wing-Cho Yip as tofo seller (cameo)
 Elsie Chan as shoe store customer (cameo)

Critical response 
"This is a somewhat funny Hong Kong comedy......there are several hits and misses in this film due to the slow plot and few redeeming qualities in the cast.....there are some funny slapstick comedy and classic Hong Kong humor that may generate some laugh-out-loud moments......It's not a bad film overall, just a tad slow."   ------ IMDb (6.5/10 based on 136 user reviews) 

"There is a lot to appreciate director Clifford Ko in this film as he simply allows Hui to showcase his scene by scene talent........this film is simply a reflection of that cultural difference, the condemning of money minded insurance companies, rich and poor gap and the nature of workers and bosses." ----- HK Neo Reviews 

On the Chinese movie review website, Douban, it received an average rating of 7.4 out of 10 based on 3691 user reviews.

Awards and nominations

References

External links

Mr. Coconut at Hong Kong Cinemagic

1989 comedy films
1989 films
1980s Cantonese-language films
Hong Kong comedy films
Hong Kong slapstick comedy films
Films directed by Clifton Ko
1980s Hong Kong films